All municipalities in the Canadian province of Ontario held elections on November 10, 1980, to elect mayors, reeves, councillors, and school trustees. Some areas also held local referendums.

Incumbent mayors were defeated in several cities. The most closely watched contest was in Toronto, where challenger Art Eggleton defeated incumbent mayor John Sewell. In Hamilton, Jack MacDonald was ousted by William Powell. In Brantford, Dave Neumann defeated incumbent mayor Charles Bowen, while in Oshawa, Allan Pilkey defeated incumbent Jim Potticary.

Several other incumbent mayors were reelected, including Marion Dewar in Ottawa, Jim Gordon in Sudbury, Ross Archer in Barrie, Hazel McCallion in Mississauga, Bert Weeks in Windsor and Morley Rosenberg in Kitchener.

In the town of Tecumseh, outgoing councillor and unsuccessful mayoral candidate Cameron Frye came out as gay at the outgoing council's last caretaker meeting before the new council was sworn in, making him one of Canada's first known openly gay holders of political office. The campaign had been marked by rumours about Frye's sexuality, including the distribution of hate literature claiming that Frye would promote a "gay lifestyle" as mayor and would lead the town into "moral decay", although Frye had refused to confirm or deny the claims about his sexuality during the campaign.

Results

Brantford

Ottawa

Toronto

References

Ontario municipal elections
Municipal elections in Ontario
Municipal elections
Ontario municipal elections